Singin' in the Rain is a stage musical with story by Betty Comden and Adolph Green, lyrics by Arthur Freed, and music by Nacio Herb Brown. Adapted from the 1952 movie of the same name, the plot closely adheres to the original. Set in Hollywood in the waning days of the silent screen era, it focuses on romantic lead Don Lockwood, his sidekick Cosmo Brown, aspiring actress Kathy Selden, and Lockwood's leading lady Lina Lamont, whose less-than-dulcet vocal tones make her an unlikely candidate for stardom in talking pictures.

The show had its world premiere in 1983 at London Palladium, where it ran for more than two years, and has spawned a Broadway production and many stagings worldwide.

Productions

Original West End production 
The original West End production, directed by Tommy Steele and choreographed by Peter Gennaro, opened on June 30, 1983 at the London Palladium, where it ran until September 1985. The original cast included Steele as Don, Roy Castle as Cosmo, Danielle Carson as Kathy, and Sarah Payne as Lina and Julia.  The original film's vocal score was embellished with additional tunes by Comden, Green, and Roger Edens, Dorothy Fields and Jimmy McHugh, George and Ira Gershwin, Johnny Mercer and Richard Whiting, and Cole Porter.

Original Broadway production 
Singin' in the Rain  opened on Broadway at the Gershwin Theatre on July 2, 1985 and closed on May 18, 1986 after 367 performances and 38 previews. Directed and choreographed by Twyla Tharp, the scenic design was by Santo Loquasto, costume design by Ann Roth, and lighting design by Jennifer Tipton. The cast included Don Correia as Don, Mary D'Arcy as Kathy, Peter Slutsker as Cosmo, and Faye Grant as Lina. The musical was dramatically revamped.

1989 West End return engagement
After touring the UK, Singin' in the Rain  returned to the London Palladium from June 29 to November 18, 1989, again with Steele as Don, Bunny May as Cosmo, Danielle Carson as Kathy, and Sarah Payne as Lina. Originally planned for a thirteen-week run, the performances were extended due to popular demand.

1994 UK tour
The 1983 London Palladium production was remounted in 1994 for an extensive tour of the United Kingdom, which ran until December 1995. The new production, again directed by Steele, starred Paul Nicholas as Don, Shona Lindsay as Kathy, Tony Howes as Cosmo with Sarah Payne reprising her role as Lina from the original cast. Supporting cast included Matt Zimmerman and Mark Donovan.

2000 National Theatre
A new production of the musical was staged at the Olivier Theatre (Royal National Theatre), from June 22 to July 20, 2000 and again from December 18, 2000, to January 27, 2001. This production was a transfer from the West Yorkshire production, which ran from December 1999 to February 2000. The cast featured Zoe Hart as Kathy, Rebecca Thornhill as Lina, and Paul Robinson as Don. The direction was by Jude Kelly, and choreography was by Stephen Mear. Thornhill received an Olivier Award nomination for her performance.

2004 Sadler's Wells Theatre
The musical was played at Sadler's Wells Theatre from July 29, 2004, to September 4, 2004, with direction by Paul Kerryson and choreography by Adam Cooper, who also played the lead role of Don Lockwood. The cast also included Simon Coulthard as Cosmo, Josefina Gabrielle as Kathy, and Ronni Ancona as Lina. Cooper's choreography was nominated for the 2004 Critic's Circle National Dance award. The show later transferred to Leicester Haymarket.

2011 Chichester Festival Theatre and 2012 West End
The show was revived at the 2011 Chichester Festival Theatre, starring Adam Cooper as Don, Daniel Crossley as Cosmo, Scarlett Strallen as Kathy, and Katherine Kingsley as Lina. It was choreographed by Andrew Wright who was nominated for an Olivier Award and won the WhatsOnStage award for his work. The show received positive reviews, and then transferred to London's West End, at the Palace Theatre, in February 2012, where Cooper, Crossley, Strallen, and Kingsley all reprised their roles. 
 From 18 February 2013 the role of Kathy Selden was played by Louise Bowden. The production closed on 8 June 2013. A cast recording of Singin' in the Rain was issued in 2012.

2013 UK tour
A UK tour followed the show closing on the West End starting on November 9 at the Manchester Opera House.

2015 Paris and proposed Broadway transfer
The Théâtre du Châtelet in Paris  presented a new production from March 12 to 26, 2015, and again from November 27 to January 17, 2016, directed by Robert Carsen, choreography by Stephen Mear, and costumes by Anthony Powell. This production faithfully reproduced the dialogue and action of the film, with its songs by Nacio Herb Brown and Arthur Freed, and its famous splash-in-the-puddles, rain-drenched dance solo for Don Lockwood.

The New York Times reported in November 2015 that the Théâtre du Châtelet production would transfer to Broadway in the fall of 2016, produced by Weinstein Live Entertainment.  However, the musical's opening on Broadway was reportedly delayed in 2016 "due to a lack of available theaters"; at that time, the musical was still expected to open on Broadway. In October 2017, Playbill reported that the Théâtre du Châtelet had informed the magazine that a Broadway transfer produced by Weinstein Live Entertainment would not take place.

2021 Sadler's Wells Theatre and 2022 UK tour 
The 2012 London production was revived at the Sadler's Wells Theatre from July 30 to September 5, 2021, with Adam Cooper reprising his role of Don Lockwood, Charlotte Gooch as Kathy Selden, Kevin Clifton as Cosmo Brown, and Faye Tozer as Lina Lamont. Following the Sadler's Wells run, another UK tour began on March 17, 2022 at the Marlowe Theatre, Canterbury and closed on August 20, 2022 at the Theatre Royal, Plymouth. This production was delayed from 2020 due to the COVID-19 pandemic.

Víðistaðaskóli 2023 
Set up by an Icelandic high school this version of the play stars Andri Ólafson as Don Lockwod, Ingi Árnason as Cosmo Brown, Karen Björg Ingólfsdóttir as Kathy Sheldan and Emelía Guðbjörg Þórðardóttir as Lina Lamont. The play follows the original script which was translated by Karl Ágúst Úlfsson 2 decades earlier. Notably this version skips "Broadway Melody". It also uses a garden hose for the rain.

Synopsis
Don Lockwood is a silent film star with humble roots as a musician, dancer and stunt man.  Don barely tolerates his vapid leading lady, Lina Lamont, who is convinced that their screen romance is real, although Don tries to tell her otherwise. After the first talking picture, The Jazz Singer, proves to be a smash hit, the head of the studio, R. F. Simpson, decides he has no choice but to convert the new Lockwood and Lamont film, The Dueling Cavalier, into a talkie. The production is beset with difficulties, by far the worst being Lina's comically grating voice.

After a disastrous test screening, Don's best friend, Cosmo Brown, comes up with the idea to overdub Lina's voice and they convince Simpson to turn The Dueling Cavalier into The Dancing Cavalier, a musical comedy film. Meanwhile, Don falls in love with an aspiring actress, Kathy Selden, who is providing the voice for Lina. When Lina finds out, she is furious and does everything possible to sabotage the romance. She maliciously demands that Kathy continue to provide her voice in all future films, but remain uncredited. An irate, but desperate Simpson is forced to agree; Kathy has no choice because she is under contract.

The premiere is a tremendous success. When the audience clamors for Lina to sing live, Don and Cosmo improvise and get Lina to lip-synch while Kathy sings into a second microphone while hidden behind the curtain. Unbeknownst to Lina, as she starts "singing", Don, Cosmo and Simpson gleefully raise the curtain behind her, revealing the deception. Kathy becomes a star, and Lina is finished.

On-stage rain
The highlight of both productions was the recreation of the film's title tune sequence, complete with an on-stage rain shower. According to The New York Times review, "The rain is wonderful. It descends from the flies of the Gershwin Theater in sheets at the end of Act I, drenching a Santo Loquasto courtyard set that floats beneath a distant, twinkling Hollywoodland sign..."

Of the London "rain" effect, a reviewer wrote: "The stage downpour is so noisy -- and poses such a danger of microphone short circuits -- that Steele has to mime his song to a tape recording."

Musical numbers

Original Broadway production

Act I
 Fit as a Fiddle - Don Lockwood and Cosmo Brown
 Beautiful Girl - Don Lockwood and Fans
 I've Got a Feelin' You're Foolin' - Kathy Selden and Coconut Grove Coquettes
 Make 'Em Laugh - Cosmo Brown
 Hub Bub - Cosmo Brown and Studio Stage Hands
 You Are My Lucky Star - Don Lockwood and Kathy Selden
 Moses Supposes - Don Lockwood and Cosmo Brown
 Good Mornin' - Don Lockwood, Kathy Selden, and Cosmo Brown
 Singin' in the Rain - Don Lockwood

Act II
 Wedding of the Painted Doll - Selected Ensemble
 Rag Doll - Selected Ensemble
 Temptation - Selected Ensemble
 Takin' Miss Mary to the Ball - Selected Ensemble
 Love is Where You Find It - Ensemble
 Would You? - Kathy Selden
 Broadway Rhythm - Company
 Blue Prelude - Company
 Would You? (Reprise) - Kathy Selden
 You Are My Lucky Star (Reprise) - Don Lockwood, Kathy Selden, and Company
 Singin' in the Rain (Reprise) - Company

2012 West End revival

Act I
 Overture - Orchestra
 Fit As a Fiddle - Don Lockwood, Cosmo Brown
 The Royal Rascal - Orchestra
 You Stepped Out of a Dream - Don Lockwood and Company
 All I Do - Kathy Selden and Girls of the Coconut Grove
 You Stepped Out of a Dream (Reprise) - Don Lockwood
 Make 'Em Laugh - Cosmo Brown
 Beautiful Girl - Production Tenor and Female Chorus (including Kathy Selden)
 You Are My Lucky Star - Kathy Selden
 You Were Meant for Me - Don Lockwood and Kathy Selden
 Moses Supposes - Don Lockwood and Cosmo Brown
 Moses Supposes (Reprise) - Company
 Good Morning - Don Lockwood, Cosmo Brown, and Kathy Selden
 Singin' in the Rain - Don Lockwood

Act II
 Entr'acte - Orchestra
 Good Morning (Reprise) - Company
 Would You? - Kathy Selden
 What's Wrong With Me? - Lina Lamont
 Broadway Ballet - Cosmo Brown, Don Lockwood, and Full Company
 Would You? (Reprise) - Kathy Selden (voicing for Lina) and Cosmo Brown
 You Are My Lucky Star (Reprise) - Kathy Selden and Don Lockwood
 Singin' in the Rain (Finale) - Full Company

Original casts

Awards and nominations

Original West End production

Original Broadway production

2000 London revival

2012 West End revival

References

External links
 
 
 Singin' in the Rain at the Music Theatre International website

1983 musicals
Broadway musicals
Dances by Twyla Tharp
Jukebox musicals
Laurence Olivier Award-winning musicals
Musicals based on films
West End musicals